Mortal Kombat: Defenders of the Realm is a 1996 American animated series based on the popular Mortal Kombat video game series. Produced by Threshold Entertainment and Film Roman, it aired on the USA Network's Action Extreme Team animation block for one season of thirteen episodes from September to December 1996, back-to-back with the Street Fighter animated series. The show serves as a combination of an alternative sequel to the first Mortal Kombat film and the events of Ultimate Mortal Kombat 3.

Plot

The show was focused on a group of warriors assembled by Raiden (spelled Rayden in the series) to defend Earthrealm from invaders who entered through portals from various other dimensions. The assembled warriors included Liu Kang, Kurtis Stryker, Sonya Blade, Jax, Kitana, and Sub-Zero, with Nightwolf functioning mostly as tech support but still entering the fray on various occasions. The warriors operated out of a hidden base from where Nightwolf and Rayden monitored portal openings; the warriors would fly dragon-shaped jets to deal with disturbances. Shao Kahn was something of an archvillain throughout the series despite appearing in only four of the series' thirteen episodes, being responsible for allowing other realms to invade Earthrealm.

The characters and their backgrounds were mostly continuous with the movie and Threshold's representation of the series canon, though many original characters exclusive to the program were introduced and some elements of Mortal Kombat 3 were included. The episode plots themselves shared little relation with that of any of the games, though the character designs are based on their MK3 and Ultimate Mortal Kombat 3 sprites (except for Kitana, whose design looks like a blend of her MKII and her UMK3 looks). Kung Lao, Johnny Cage, Mileena, Sindel, Goro and Kintaro were not shown or referenced in the show at all, while characters based on Reptile, Baraka, and Jade were featured.

The finale involved Kitana leading a rebellion from Outworld against Kahn. The most notable aspect of the show was that it provided the debut of Quan Chi, who would go on to become a major antagonist in the game series.

Voice cast
 Clancy Brown as Raiden / Ermac
 Olivia d'Abo as Sonya Blade
 Dorian Harewood as Jax
 Luke Perry as Sub-Zero
 Cree Summer as Princess Kitana
 Ron Perlman as Kurtis Stryker
 Tod Thawley as Nightwolf
 Brian Tochi as Liu Kang

Episodes

Crossover
The episode 9, "Resurrection" is part 3 of a 4-episode crossover with several other shows that aired as part of the USA "Action Extreme Team" programming block:

 Street Fighter (1995-1997, US, Canada, animated): episode 22 "The Warrior King" (Part 1)
 Savage Dragon (1995–1996, US, Canada, animated): episode 21 (208) "Endgame" (Part 2)
 Wing Commander Academy (1996, US, animated): episode 8 "Recreation" (Part 4)

This crossover event featured the mysterious figure, whose identity wasn't revealed in "Resurrection", and the orb but the principal characters of the four series don't meet each other.

Home media
Three volumes of 12 episodes (excluding "Sting of the Scorpion") were released in the UK, while in Australia, the complete series was released across six volumes. The complete series was also released on a two-DVD set in Russia, containing both Russian and English dubbing. Brazil has also received a three-disc DVD set, with a new Brazilian Portuguese dub and original English audio. In Spain, they received four volume DVDs. In the United States, only a select number of episodes were individually available on VHS, while there was never a DVD release.

Reception

Critical response
Defenders of the Realm received a negative response from viewers and critics, and was canceled after only one season. In 2011, 1UP.com featured the series in the article "The Top Ten Times Mortal Kombat Went Wrong", calling it "a terrible, one-liner-packed train wreck of a kids' show". The site also included the show among their list of the top five "Not-So-Classic Video Game Cartoons" while quoting the introduction's opening line: "'Much has changed since the last Mortal Kombat tournament!' Yeah, like nobody being allowed to kill each other anymore". GameFront called it an "abomination". GamesRadar included the series among their picks for the worst video game-based animated TV shows: "Not content with skimping on violence, the show's creators felt that they also needed to ... teach the youth of America life lessons with comically cheesy public service announcements". Dorkly rated it sixth in their list of the top eight worst animated video game TV adaptations, citing the lack of violence as a contributor to its demise.

See also
Street Fighter (TV series)
Darkstalkers (TV series)

References

External links

1990s American animated television series
1990s American science fiction television series
1996 American television series debuts
1996 American television series endings
American children's animated action television series
American children's animated adventure television series
American children's animated science fantasy television series
Animated series based on video games
Alternative sequel television series
Martial arts television series
Defenders of the Realm
USA Action Extreme Team
USA Network original programming
Television series by New Line Television
Television series by Film Roman